Horse and Rider may refer to:

Astronomy
 Horse and Rider (asterism), an informal name given to the stars Mizar and Alcor

Magazines
 Horse & Rider, a monthly magazine in the United States
 Horse&Rider, a magazine published in the United Kingdom

Sculptures
 Horse and Rider (Frink), a modern sculpture by Elisabeth Frink
 Horse and Rider (Marini), a modern equestrian bronze sculpture by Marino Marini
 Horse and Rider (wax sculpture), a wax sculpture attributed to Leonardo da Vinci, c.1508
 Rearing Horse and Mounted Warrior, a bronze sculpture attributed to Leonardo da Vinci, and called Horse and rider by some sources

See also
 Horse (disambiguation)
 Rider (disambiguation)